大山, literally meaning "Big Mountain", may refer to:

Chinese reading Dàshān:
Dashan (born 1965), foreign celebrity in China
Dashan Station, Miaoli County, Taiwan
Dashan Township, Qian Gorlos Mongol Autonomous County, a township in Qian Gorlos Mongol Autonomous County, Jilin, China. 
Dashan Township, Lancang County, a township in Lancang Lahu Autonomous County, Yunnan, China. 

Japanese on-yomi Daisen:
Daisen, Tottori
Daisen (mountain), Tottori Prefecture, Japan

Japanese kun-yomi Ōyama:
Ōyama Station (Tokyo), Tobu Railway
Mount Ōyama (Kanagawa), part of the Tateyama Mountains
Ōyama, Ōita, former town
Ōyama, Toyama, former town
Kana Oyama (born 1984), Japanese volleyball player
Shungo Oyama (born 1974), Japanese mixed martial artist

Korean reading Daesan:
Daesan-eup, Seosan, Chungcheongnam-do, South Korea